The organisation of the Methodist Church of Great Britain is based on the principle of connexionalism. This means that British Methodism, from its inception under John Wesley (1703–1791), has always laid strong emphasis on mutual support, in terms of ministry, mission and finance, of one local congregation for another. No singular church community has ever been seen in isolation either from its immediately neighbouring church communities or from the centralised national organisation. Wesley himself journeyed around the country, preaching and establishing local worshipping communities, called "societies", often under lay leadership. Soon these local communities of worshipping Christians formalised their relationships with neighbouring Methodist communities to create "circuits", and the circuits and societies contained within them, were from the very beginning 'connected' (hence the distinctive Methodist concept of the "Connexion") to the centre and Methodism's governing body, the annual Conference. Today, societies are better known as local churches, although the concept of a community of worshipping Christians tied to a particular location, and subdivided into smaller cell groups called "classes", remains essentially based on Wesley's societies.

Other Methodist Churches which were established by British Missionaries are also modelled on the structure of the British Church.

Historical origins

The first circuits, 1746

The earliest preachers under John Wesley were itinerant, and preached around an area from a home base.  The "circuit", or "round" as they were first named, was therefore the natural name for the area they covered. At first they were named after their founder of main itinerant preacher. For example, 'John Bennet's Round', or the 'Circuit of William Darney's Societies'. The first official list dates from 1746.
  London  (including Surrey, Kent, Essex, Brentford, Egham, Windsor, Wycombe);
  Bristol (including Somerset, Portland, Wiltshire, Oxfordshire, Gloucester);
  Cornwall
  Evesham (including Shrewsbury, Leominster, Hereford, and from Stroud to Wednesbury);
  Yorkshire (including Cheshire, Lancashire, Derbyshire, Nottinghamshire, Rutland, Lincolnshire);
  Newcastle
  Wales

Within that area a number of "societies" would be formed. During the 18th century, John Wesley did not intend establishing churches in a new denomination. His vision was for a revival movement within the Church of England. The societies would be a gathering of people who met for Bible study, prayer, mutual encouragement, and preaching. Usually, this was during the week so that they could attend services in the parish church. The earliest circuits covered a very large area, but gradually shrank as the number of societies increased.

Milestones in Wesley's early Methodism
The first Wesleyan Methodist society was formed in 1738, the first Methodist building was The Foundery acquired in 1739, and the first class meetings were in 1742.

The first (Wesleyan) Methodist Conference took place at the Foundery in June 1744.  The known first plan (of preaching appointments) was made by Wesley in London in 1754. The first recorded quarterly meeting (the usual business meeting of the circuit) was at Todmorden Edge Farm, Todmorden, on 18 October 1748.

John Wesley drew on existing structures, especially those used by the Moravians, who had been so instrumental in his own spiritual development.  At their Herrnhut colony he witnessed gatherings for testimony and mutual edification, select bands, classes, conferences on doctrine, open air preaching, preaching by laymen, itinerant preachers, and orphan homes.  Most of these features had, indeed, been anticipated by the Waldenses in the 16th century, between whose organisation and that of the Moravians and Methodists there are striking, though probably accidental, resemblances.

The beginnings of class meetings
The Wesleyan societies were composed of "bands", which were meetings of 5 to 10 like-minded people seeking Christian perfection, and considered the inner core of the societies. John Wesley drew up rules for these in December 1738. Some of the early societies were known by the name of the person in whose home they met, such as 'Mr. Fox's Society', and 'Mr. Ingham's Society'. The origin of the "class" was partly accidental.  By 1742, John and Charles Wesley had about 1100 Methodists in London for whom they felt a pastoral responsibility, but could not keep in touch with them and continue their other work.  While in Bristol, John Wesley met some members of the society there. One, Captain Foy, suggested that every member give a penny a week until a debt there be paid.  When someone objected due to the poverty of many, he offered that 11 of the poorest be grouped with him, he would collect the subscription, and make up any shortfall if any could not pay. Soon afterwards, on hearing that someone was not living as he should, Wesley realised that the group of 12 for collection of money was the basis of a group for weekly meeting for prayer, Bible study, and mutual encouragement. 

A class book was kept recording their attendance and their contribution to the funds. When membership rolls started being used to record names of those attending, the very early ones begin with a list of class members. Members were defined as those who had been baptised, received instruction in Methodist governance, and at a special service, were received into "full membership". Others in the congregation were called simply "adherents", and although they supported the activities of the Church as fully as members, they did not enjoy voting rights. Each class was headed by a class leader.

One function of the class leader is that the "class ticket", a quarterly membership ticket for Methodists, be given to his class members, and withheld from those whom they judged unworthy of being called Methodists. The ticket is the membership card for Methodists.

Wesley did not claim the class as essential or of "divine institution", but as wise for practical regulation of Methodists.

Methodist structures

The following is a summary of the main units.

Connexion

The old-fashioned spelling of connexion reflects Methodism's origins in the 18th century, when the term was used generally, in e.g. political, commercial and religious contexts, to refer to the circle of those connected to some person or group, and to the relationship thus created. But it was the particular character of the connexion John Wesley maintained with his members, his societies and his itinerant preachers that gave the term its technical significance in Methodism. All were in connexion primarily with him and thence with each other. The term came to be in some senses equivalent to 'denomination' and, later, to 'Church', and connexionalism was descriptive of a particular principle and pattern of church life which emphasized the interdependence of the constituent parts (over against independency). All circuits and districts are ultimately subject to the annual Conference. 

After Wesley's death, schisms and resultant branches of Methodism in Britain meant that there were multiple connexions, each with its own conference, before the connexions were united in 1932. Whilst the various branches differed in the balance of authority accorded to the various levels of church government, all accepted some form of connexionalism. This was manifested in "a common bond of discipline and usage for the societies with transferable membership, and the itinerant ministry of those 'in full connexion' with the Conference and stationed by the Conference". Methodist ministers are still "received into full connexion" prior to being ordained.

Supporting the annual conference, the Methodist Council meets three times each year. The 2022 Conference agreed to establish a new body, the Connexional Council, which will replace the Methodist Council and the former Strategy and Resources Committee.

District
Districts are geographical units, typically one to three counties in extent. There are thirty districts across Great Britain—including two overlapping districts in Wales, one English-speaking and one Welsh. The governing body is called a synod. The Methodist Church formally defines the nature and purpose of the district as being:

Circuit
A circuit is a grouping of local churches under the care of one or more ministers. They number about 360, and this figure is declining as more circuits amalgamate. The circuit is the main functional unit of Methodism, in that a large number of activities are organised at this level. Ministers are appointed firstly to the circuit and then secondly to the pastoral care of local churches. This means ministers will ordinarily preach and lead worship each Sunday in any church on the circuit but during the rest of the week they exercise pastoral charge over a subset of churches in that circuit. Preaching appointments for both ministers and (lay) local preachers are organised by the circuit and advertised on a preaching plan issued every three months by the leader of the circuit, the superintendent minister.

Local church

Also called "societies" in certain formal contexts (although an increasingly antiquated name), the term "local church" can refer to both the congregation as well as the particular building it meets in. Membership is always tied to the local church, where members meet together for worship and fellowship. Each congregation is led by a presbyter in charge—also referred to as "the minister".  there were almost 170,000 members of 4,110 churches.

Class
A class is a group of Methodists, normally about twelve, under the guidance of a class leader. In the 20th century it became less common for classes to actually meet together, but many local churches have home fellowships, Bible studies groups, and cell groups by other names. Under the church's Constitutional Practice and Discipline (CPD), where the number of registered local church members falls below six over four successive quarters, the formal "local church" ceases to be recognised as such and is often treated as a "class" subject to the oversight of another Methodist Church or leader.

List of districts and circuits

Superscriptions indicate a local ecumenical partnership (LEP) with one or more other denominations: (B) Baptist; (C) Church of England; (Co) Congregational; (E) Scottish Episcopal Church; (I) Welsh Independents; (M) Moravian; (P) Presbyterian Church of Wales; (S) Church of Scotland; (U) United Reformed Church; (W) Church in Wales

Newcastle upon Tyne District 
Bede Circuit; Chester-le-Street Circuit; East Durham Circuit; Lindisfarne Circuit; Newcastle upon Tyne Central & East Circuit; Newcastle upon Tyne West Circuit; North Shields & Whitley Bay Circuit; North West Durham Circuit; South East Northumberland Ecumenical Area; South West Tyneside Circuit; Sunderland Circuit; Tynedale Circuit
Nottingham and Derby District 
Alfreton (Watchorn) Circuit a.k.a. Borders Mission; Ashbourne Circuit; Derby Circuit; Grantham & Vale of Belvoir Circuit; Mid Derbyshire Circuit; National Forest East Circuit; Newark & Southwell Circuit; Nottingham East Circuit; Nottingham North Circuit; Nottingham South Circuit; Nottingham Trent Valley Circuit; Sherwood Forest Circuit; South Derbyshire Circuit; Trent & Dove Circuit
Nottingham Central Mission operates independently
Northampton District 
Amersham Circuit; Banbury Circuit; Buckingham, Bicester & Brackley Circuit; Chipping Norton  & Stow Circuit;East Mercia( replaced Kettering and corby, market harborough and rugby and daventry in september 2022) High Wycombe Circuit; Hinckley Circuit; Leicester (Trinity) Circuit; Leicester (West) Circuit, loughborough circuit; Melton Mowbray Circuit; Milton Keynes Circuit; Nene Valley Circuit; Northampton Circuit; Oxford Circuit; Peterborough circuit, Stamford Circuit; Vale of Aylesbury Circuit; Wantage & Abingdon Circuit; Witney & Faringdon Circuit
Plymouth and Exeter District 
Bude & Holsworthy Circuit; Exeter, Coast & Country Circuit; Ilfracombe & Barnstaple Circuit; Plymouth & Devonport Circuit; Ringsash Circuit; South Devon Circuit; South Molton & Ringsash Circuit; South Peverton & Crewkerne Circuit; Taunton Deane & Sedgemoor Circuit; Tavistock Circuit; Teignbridge Circuit; Tiverton & Wellington Circuit; Torbay Circuit; Torridge Circuit; West Devon Circuit; West Somerset Circuit 
Plymouth Methodist Mission operates independently 
Sheffield District 
Barnsley Circuit; Bolsover & Staveley Circuit; Chesterfield Circuit; Doncaster Circuit; The Peak Circuit; Rotherham & Dearne Valley Circuit; Sheffield Circuit; Trinity Circuit
Southampton District 
Basingstoke & Reading Circuit; Bridport & Dorchester Circuit; Christchurch & Wimborne Circuit; East Solent & Downs Circuit; Isle of Wight Circuit; Kennet & Test Valley Circuit; Meon Valley Circuit; Poole Bay Circuit; Portland Circuit; Salisbury Circuit; Southampton Circuit; Weymouth Circuit; Winchester, Eastleigh & Romsey Circuit; Yeovil & Blackmore Vale Circuit;
Wolverhampton and Shrewsbury District 
The Black Country Circuit; Brownhills & Willenhall Circuit; Cannock Chase Circuit; Dudley & Netherton Circuit; Gornal & Sedgley Circuit; Kidderminster & Stourport Circuit; Shropshire & Marches Circuit; Stafford Circuit; Telford Circuit; Vale of Stour Circuit; Walsall Circuit; Wolverhampton Circuit
Yorkshire North and East District 
Beverley Circuit; Bridlington Circuit; Driffield-Hornsea Circuit; Goole & Selby Circuit; Hull Centre & West Circuit; Nidd Valley Circuit; North Yorkshire Coast Circuit; Pateley Bridge Circuit; Pocklington & Market Weighton Circuit; Ripon & Lower Dales Circuit; Ryedale Circuit; South Holderness Circuit; Tadcaster Circuit; Thirsk & Northallerton Circuit; York Circuit
Yorkshire West District 
Aire & Calder Circuit; Airedale Circuit; Bradford North Circuit; Bradford South Circuit; Calderdale Circuit; Denby Dale & Clayton West Circuit; Huddersfield Circuit; Leeds North & East Circuit; Leeds South & West Circuit; North Kirklees & Morley Circuit; Settle Circuit; Skipton & Grassington Circuit; Wharfedale & Aireborough Circuit;

Notes
a. The Gibraltar Circuit became part of the then London South West District in 1997, and is now a circuit in the South East District. The Methodist/Church of Scotland LEP in Malta is also part of the South East District.
b. On 1 September 2017, the four former districts in Yorkshire were reduced to three: Yorkshire North and East, Yorkshire West and Sheffield.

Titles and officeholders

The people involved in Methodist organisation are as follows.

Early Methodism, as organised by Wesley, had "local preachers" and "travelling preachers".  A local preacher was a layman appointed to preach within his own circuit.  A travelling preacher, or "minister" (specifically, a presbyter) in modern Methodism, is appointed by Conference to serve for a limited time in a circuit and then move around the country to any other circuit where Conference may send him.  In Wesley's time, this could be as little as a few months. As Methodism became more settled as a denomination, this was from one to four years, now typically five to ten years.  In recent years, some circuits may also have lay pastors.

The non-pastoral work is done by "church stewards" and "circuit stewards". These are appointed to various functions, such as treasurer, or property steward, etc. to look after various practical needs.  Usually these are voluntary workers, but some situations also require paid staff.

Structure

Methodism holds in principle 'the priesthood of all believers', which is a Protestant doctrine that all true Christians have equal access to God, and Church offices are functional rather than hierarchical. So while this list implies a chain of authority, it is of function rather than rank.

President and Vice-President of Conference

The president of conference is a presbyter, with the vice-president being a layperson or deacon. The one exception was layman William Hartley, elected President of the Primitive Methodist Conference in 1909.

Nominations are invited each year for president and vice-president. Each is voted upon and designated a year ahead. Each nomination needs to be signed by five ministerial and five lay members of the Representative Session of the Conference. Nominations are collected during the first three days of that Session and displayed for 24 hours before a vote is taken. Voting is by single transferable vote. Voters do not choose one name only but mark all the names in order of preference. In this way if their first choice is not elected, they may influence the voting for an alternative.

The Conference resolves at the beginning of the Representative Session that the president designated the previous year be elected and similarly for the vice-president-designate. Each holds office for one year.

Chair of the District

A minister who is appointed to take administrative responsibility, along with pastoral responsibility for the ministers, for a district.  This is undertaken as if a normal appointment to serve in a circuit, and the term of service is typically some 5 to 10 years.

Superintendent and circuit ministers

The senior minister on any circuit is the superintendent (sometimes informally shortened to "super"), who may be the only minister, though the current trend for amalgamation of circuits makes this rare.  The superintendent will also have pastoral responsibility for at least one of the local churches on the circuit, with pastoral responsibility for others being allocated to the other ministers.

Deacons
Ministers within the Methodist Diaconal Order (MDO) are referred to as deacons. A warden is appointed by the Conference from among the deacons to exercise oversight over the MDO, and there is now also a deputy warden.

Local preachers

Local preachers are accredited laypeople who preach and lead worship services in any church on the circuit to which they may be appointed. In Wesleyan Methodism it was not usual practice for local preachers to administer the Lord's Supper (Holy Communion), but in Primitive Methodism (1811 to 1932 in Britain) the local preachers did administer sacraments. Local preachers continue to serve an indispensable role in the Methodist Church, with the majority of church services led by laypeople, but special authorisation is required to preside over Communion.

Meetings

The "Circuit Meeting" (originally the "Quarterly Meeting") is the main governing body of the circuit, and consists of all ministers living in the circuit, circuit officers, and officers and elected representatives of the various churches in the circuit. The circuit officers are officially responsible for the running of a circuit; they are collectively responsible for finances, though almost invariably one of them will be appointed treasurer. The preachers (local preachers and ministers) also hold a quarterly "(Local) Preachers' Meeting" that governs worship and preaching issues.

The "Church Council" is held twice per year or as required to govern the business of individual churches. Officers of the church council will include a secretary and treasurer.

Other countries
Some Methodist churches in countries outside Britain have retained the circuit system; others have not, or never had it.  Where Methodist churches have entered national united churches (such as the Church of South India or the United Church of Canada, the circuit system has generally disappeared or been greatly modified even if it existed before.  The US United Methodist Church does not at present operate on a circuit system, though something like it is reappearing in places. The Methodist Church of New Zealand has a circuit system, but refers to its circuits as parishes.

Case history – the Wetton and Longnor Methodist Circuit

The place of the circuit in Methodism can be understood from a specific example, the Wetton and Longnor Methodist Circuit providing an example from rural Methodism.

The diagrammatic map of the Leek area shows the number of "preaching stations" and chapels in existence during the 18th and 19th centuries, both Wesleyan and Primitive.  (This is not exhaustive, but shows information at the time of drawing.) Some of the places were cottages or farmhouses, and not the final location of a chapel.  The diagram includes a reference to a preaching plan of 1798.

It is easier to describe the origins of the Wetton and Longnor Circuit by reference to the "family tree," which shows the sequence by which the north of England was divided into Circuits of smaller areas as the number of Methodists grew.  This had the advantages of both reducing the time spent in traveling, and ensuring that the work load of the Travelling Preachers was manageable.

In 1870, the Wesleyan Leek Circuit was divided to form the Wetton and Longnor Circuit.  A new manse was built at Wetton to house the minister.  The Methodist Union of 1932 brought new chapels from the Primitive Methodists. In some cases, such as at Warslow, this meant having two buildings in the same road a couple of hundred yards apart.  The P.M. building was the more suitable, so the Wesleyan building was eventually sold.

In 1962, for example, there were 10 societies in the Circuit.  These were Wetton, Alstonefield, Hartington. Butterton, Warslow, Longnor,  Rewlach, Sheen, Newtown, and Hollinsclough.  Rewlach, for example, was a chapel in a remote location associated with one farmhouse and little else.  Yet even in the 1990s, not long before closure, it still attracted enough people to fill the building for harvest festival.  The only chapel still open as a place of worship is Hollinsclough, which celebrated its 200th anniversary at Easter 2001.

Modern population trends, and economic pressures, led to the end of Wetton and Longnor as a separate Circuit.  In 1969, it ceased and the various chapels were allocated to neighbouring Circuits of Leek, Ashbourne and Buxton.  It is not only Methodist chapels that have closed.  Many village schools have also closed during the same time.

See also

 Penitent band
 Annual Conferences of the United Methodist Church
 Parish, Deanery and Diocese – the organisational units in the Church of England
 Ecclesiastical polity
 List of Methodist churches

References

External links
The Connexion - The Methodist Church
Districts, circuits and other Methodist organisations

Methodism in the United Kingdom
Circuit
History of Methodism
Church organization